is the daily newspaper of the Japanese Communist Party in the form of a national newspaper. It was founded in 1928 and currently has both daily and weekly editions.

Akahata has journalists based in the capitals of ten countries around the globe.  They are Beijing, Berlin, Cairo, Hanoi, London, Mexico City, Moscow, New Delhi, Paris, and Washington, D.C.

Some of their journalism deals with activist politics, but they also do original reporting on a wide variety of political issues which are often untouched in Japan. Most Japanese newspapers publish the names of alleged criminals, but Akahata often declines to publish their names, unless they are related to organized crime or right-wing activities. They also go out of their way to avoid using polite terms for the Emperor of Japan; for example, the paper refers to the Emperor's Cup exclusively as "a Japanese soccer tournament". They refer to the Buraku Liberation League as the "Liberation" League, using scare quotes to convey their opposition to the group.

Japan Press Weekly is the newspaper's English edition.

Circulation over time 
In 1959, Akahata had a daily circulation of around 40,000. By the end of 1960, as a result of recruitment drives conducted in conjunction with the 1960 Anpo Protests, circulation soared to around 100,000. By 1970, the newspaper had over 400,000 subscribers to its daily edition, and more than 1 million subscribers to its Sunday edition. In the early 1990s, daily subscribers were over 3 million. However, by 2007, daily circulation had fallen to around 1.6 million, and fell further to around 1.0 million by 2019.

See also 
 List of newspapers in Japan 
 Japanese media

References

Further reading

External links 
 Shimbun Akahata 
 Japan Press Weekly

Japanese Communist Party
1928 establishments in Japan
Japanese-language newspapers
Daily newspapers published in Japan
Publications established in 1928
Communist newspapers
Newspapers published in Tokyo